David Van Buren House is a historic home located near Fulton in Oswego County, New York.  It consists of a -story, five-by-three-bay, main block with a large 1-story rear wing in the Greek Revival style. The brick structure was constructed in 1847.

It was listed on the National Register of Historic Places in 1988.

References

Houses on the National Register of Historic Places in New York (state)
Houses completed in 1847
Houses in Oswego County, New York
1847 establishments in New York (state)
National Register of Historic Places in Oswego County, New York